The TECHART 997 Carrera, known also as the TECHART Coupe and TECHART Cabrio, depending on the body style, is a tuning program for Porsche 997 models including the Carrera, Carrera Cabriolet, Carrera 4, Carrera 4 Cabriolet, Carrera S, Carrera S Cabriolet, Carrera 4S, and Carrera 4S Cabriolet.  As with other TechArt products, the kit includes the customer's choice of options, including a body kit, engine upgrades, interior refitment, and custom wheels.

Design and features

The TECHART Coupe/Cabriolet features a bodykit with high-downforce front and rear spoilers, a rear diffuser, side skirts, and mirror and headlight housings. The car is fitted with TECHART Formula alloy wheels ranging from 18 to 20 inches, and ContiSportContact 2 VMax tires. A full range of interior customizations are available and tailored to customer taste. To aid the car's performance, a range of suspension kits, depending on the wheel and tire combinations, can be installed.

Police car

It was based on 911 Carrera S.

The vehicle was unveiled in 2005 TUNE IT! SAFE!.

References

External links
TechArt official 997 Carrera tuning page

Coupés
Rear-wheel-drive vehicles
All-wheel-drive vehicles
TechArt vehicles
Cars powered by boxer engines

Rear-engined vehicles